The 95th Fighter Squadron (95 FS) is a disbanded F-22 Raptor squadron of the United States Air Force. Last activated on 11 October 2013 and stationed at Tyndall Air Force Base, Florida, the squadron's aircraft and personnel were distributed across other bases in the aftermath of Hurricane Michael in 2018 and its destruction of large parts of Tyndall Air Force Base. It was subsequently disbanded in 2019.

The 95th flew combat in the European Theater of Operations and the Mediterranean Theater of Operations between 25 December 1942 and 3 May 1945.

It flew fighter escort and air defense from 1947 to 1949 and air defense from 1952–1973.

Prior to 2010 it conducted advanced fighter training for the F-15 Eagle.

History

World War II

The squadron was activated in early 1942 at Harding Field, Louisiana as the 95th Pursuit Squadron, one of the original three squadrons of the 82d Pursuit Group. It soon moved to California where it equipped with Lockheed P-38 Lightnings and began training with Fourth Air Force as the 95th Fighter Squadron.  It left California in the fall and sailed for Northern Ireland, where it received additional combat training under Eighth Air Force.  A month after the initial Operation Torch landings in North Africa the squadron deployed to Algeria, where it entered combat as an element of Twelfth Air Force.

In North Africa, the squadron flew antisubmarine patrols, bomber escort missions and attacked enemy shipping and airfields, moving its base east through Algeria and Tunisia.  As the North African campaign drew to a close, the unit began attacking targets in Italy, earning a Distinguished Unit Citation for its actions on 25 April 1943 during an attack on enemy airfields in Foggia. On this mission, the squadron's aircraft flew hundreds of miles at an altitude of 100 feet to destroy dozens of enemy aircraft at Foggia while suffering minimal losses,

In May 1943, the 95th was tasked with bombing Pantellaria, supporting the Allied invasion of Sicily.  In part due to the squadron's efforts the garrison surrender just prior to the Allies landing on the island.   In September, the squadron participated in Operation Husky, the invasion of Sicily, during which it was awarded a second Distinguished Unit Citation for a bomber escort mission against marshalling yards near Naples. In this mission the squadron protected 72 North American B-25 Mitchells without loss while destroying numerous attacking enemy fighters.

The squadron moved to Italy, where it became part of Fifteenth Air Force as part of the buildup to provide fighter cover for Fifteenth's heavy bombers. On 10 June 1944 the squadron earned a third Distinguished Unit Citation for its actions during an attack on oil refineries in Ploiești, Romania. During this attack each aircraft carried a 1,000-pound bomb and a 300-gallon gas tank. The squadron also took part in some of the first shuttle missions to the Soviet Union.

At the end of World War II, the 95th destroyed more than 400 aircraft including 199 air-to-air kills and had seven aces. Following the surrender of Germany, the squadron remained in Italy until September 1945, when it was inactivated

Strategic Air Command
In 1947 the squadron was again activated at Grenier Field, New Hampshire, where it was equipped with North American P-51 Mustangs as a Strategic Air Command fighter escort unit. Between April and June 1948 the squadron deployed to Ladd Air Force Base, Alaska, where it practiced rendezvousing with and escorting bombers, intercepting simulated enemy bombers and aerial gunnery. In August 1949 it was transferred to Continental Air Command and its primary role became air defense, but this mission change was brief, for the squadron was inactivated in October.

Air Defense

In late 1952, the squadron, now designated the 95th Fighter-Interceptor Squadron, was activated under Air Defense Command (ADC) and assigned to the 4710th Defense Wing.  It was stationed at Andrews Air Force Base, Maryland, where it replaced the federalized 121st Fighter-Interceptor Squadron, which was returned to the control of the District of Columbia Air National Guard. The 95th took over the personnel, mission, and Lockheed F-94 Starfire aircraft of the inactivating 121st. The squadron was tasked with defending Washington, D.C., and the surrounding area against the threat of manned bomber attacks.

In May 1953 the squadron replaced its cannon armed F-94Bs with Mighty Mouse rocket armed North American F-86D Sabres. In 1956, as ADC prepared to upgrade its system to the Semi-Automatic Ground Environment (SAGE), the 4710th wing was discontinued and the squadron was reassigned to the 85th Air Division. In 1957, the squadron replaced its Sabres with the F-86L model, which was equipped with data link to receive commands directly from the SAGE combat direction center without using voice radio.

The squadron's F-86L period lasted only a few months, however, for it converted to AIM-4 Falcon armed Convair F-102 Delta Daggers in February 1958. A final interceptor upgrade occurred in September 1959 when the unit became operational with the Convair F-106 Delta Dart.   On 22 October 1962, before President John F. Kennedy told Americans that missiles were in place in Cuba, the squadron dispersed one third of its force, equipped with nuclear tipped missiles to Atlantic City International Airport at the start of the Cuban Missile Crisis. These planes returned to Andrews after the crisis.

In July 1963 the squadron moved to Dover Air Force Base, Delaware, where its F-106s replaced the McDonnell F-101 Voodoos of the 98th Fighter-Interceptor Squadron. which moved from Dover to Suffolk County Air Force Base the preceding month. The 95th maintained a 24-hour alert status at both Dover, while its Detachment 1 did so at Atlantic City International Airport, New Jersey.  Its F-106 aircraft could be called to action and within minutes, be airborne fully loaded and armed with nuclear missiles.

In 1968, following the Pueblo Incident, The Air Force tasked ADC to provide alert F-106s at Osan Air Base, Korea.  Following the 1969 EC-121 shootdown incident, the deployed F-106s began flying escort missions for EC-121s.  In November 1969, the squadron deployed to Korea to assume this duty. relieving the 94th Fighter-Interceptor Squadron.  In May 1970, this tasking ended and the unit returned to Dover.

Fighter training
The squadron was activated at Tyndall Air Force Base on 15 August 1974, as the 95th Fighter Interceptor Training Squadron.  Upon arrival at Tyndall, the 95th transitioned from the F-106 to the T-33 Shooting Star, where they flew in support of Tyndall's Weapons Controller (now known as Air Battle Manager) training program. They also provided training to pilots newly assigned to the T-33 as well as drone chase support for the Air Force's Weapons System Evaluation Program at Tyndall. The 95th FITS was the last active USAF unit to operate the T-33, affectionately known by its crews as the "T-Bird".  In 1988, the 95th retired its last T-Birds and gained the mission of providing combat crew training for pilots flying the McDonnell Douglas F-15 Eagle.  At this time, the 95th was redesignated the 95th Tactical Fighter Training Squadron. In 1991, the 95th was redesignated the 95th Fighter Squadron, which remained the squadron's designation until the time of its inactivation in September 2010.

Though the 95th's mission was air dominance training, and was not an operational squadron, during Operation Noble Eagle, the 95th Fighter Squadron generated combat-configured McDonnell Douglas F-15 Eagles and flew combat air patrol missions over cities in the southeastern United States.  However, the F-15 was aging and reduced budgets led to the Air Force to retire all F-15A/B and a portion of F-15C/D model aircraft and inactivate F-15C/D training units in the Regular Air Force and move the F-15C/D training mission to the Air National Guard.  As a result, the squadron was inactivated in September 2010.

Air Dominance
The squadron was activated once again in October 2013 at Tyndall as a combat-coded Lockheed Martin F-22 Raptor unit.  The unit received aircraft from the 7th Fighter Squadron at Holloman Air Force Base beginning in January 2014. The 95th completed acceptance of its fleet and gained initial operational capability in April 2014.

2018 relocation and subsequent disbandment
In October 2018, large parts of Tyndall Air Force Base were damaged by Hurricane Michael. Subsequently, Tyndall's flying units were relocated to other bases, with the 2nd Fighter Training Squadron and 43rd Fighter Squadron being relocated to Eglin Air Force Base, Florida, while the aircraft and personnel of the 95th Fighter Squadron were split up and relocated to Joint Base Elmendorf–Richardson, Alaska, Joint Base Langley–Eustis, Virginia, and Joint Base Pearl Harbor–Hickam, Hawaii. The squadron was disbanded in 2019.

Lineage

 Constituted as the 95th Pursuit Squadron (Interceptor) on 13 January 1942
 Activated on 9 February 1942
 Redesignated 95th Pursuit Squadron (Interceptor)(Twin Engine) on 22 April 1942
 Redesignated 95th Fighter Squadron (Twin Engine) on 15 May 1942
 Redesignated 95th Fighter Squadron, Two Engine on 28 February 1944
 Inactivated on 9 September 1945
 Activated on 12 April 1947
 Redesignated 95th Fighter Squadron, Single Engine on 15 August 1947
 Inactivated on 2 October 1949
 Redesignated 95th Fighter-Interceptor Squadron on 11 September 1952
 Activated on 1 November 1952
 Inactivated on 31 January 1973
 Redesignated 95th Fighter-Interceptor Training Squadron on 15 August 1974
 Activated on 1 September 1974
 Redesignated: 95th Tactical Fighter Training Squadron on 1 April 1988
 Redesignated: 95th Fighter Squadron on 1 November 1991
 Inactivated on 21 September 2010
 Activated on 11 October 2013
 Disbanded in 2019

Assignments
 82d Fighter Group: 9 February 1942 – 9 September 1945
 82d Fighter Group: 12 April 1947 – 2 October 1949
 4710th Defense Wing (later 4710th Air Defense Wing): 1 November 1952
 85th Air Division: 1 March 1956
 Washington Air Defense Sector: 1 September 1958
 New York Air Defense Sector: 1 July 1963
 21st Air Division: 1 April 1966 (attached to Fifth Air Force ADVON after 15 November 1969)
 20th Air Division: 19 November 1969 – 31 January 1973 (attached to 5th Air Force ADVON until c. 1 May 1970)
 Air Defense Weapons Center: 1 September 1974
 325th Fighter Weapons Wing (later 325th Tactical Training Wing): 1 July 1981
 325th Operations Group: 1 September 1991 – 21 September 2010
 325th Operations Group: 11 October 2013 – present

Stations
 Harding Field, Louisiana, 9 February 1942
 Muroc Army Air Field, California, 30 April 1942
 Mines Field, California, 20 May 1942 – 16 September 1942
 RAF Eglinton,(Station 344) Northern Ireland, 3 October 1942
 Tafaraoui Airport, Algeria, 24 December 1942
 Telergma Airfield, Algeria, 1 January 1943
 Berteaux Airfield, Algeria, 28 May 1943
 Souk-el-Arba Airfield, Tunisia, 13 June 1943
 Grombalia Airfield, Tunisia, 4 August 1943
 San Pancrazio Airfield, Italy, 3 October 1943
 Lecce Airfield, Italy, 10 October 1943
 Vincenzo Airfield, Italy, 11 January 1944
 Lesina Airfield, Italy, c. 30 August 1945 – 9 September 1945
 Grenier Field (later Grenier Air Force Base), New Hampshire, 12 April 1947 – 2 October 1949
deployed to Ladd Air Force Base, Alaska, 4 April 1948 – 29 June 1948
 Andrews Air Force Base, Maryland, 1 November 1952
 Dover Air Force Base, Delaware, 1 July 1963 – 31 January 1973
 Deployed to Osan Air Base, South Korea, 15 November 1969 – c. 1 May 1970
 Tyndall Air Force Base, Florida, 1 September 1974 – 21 September 2010
 Tyndall Air Force Base, Florida, 11 October 2013 – unknown
 Joint Base Elmendorf–Richardson, Alaska, November 2018 – unknown
 Joint Base Langley–Eustis, Virginia, November 2018 – unknown
 Joint Base Pearl Harbor–Hickam, Hawaii, November 2018 – unknown

Detachment
 Detachment 1, Atlantic City International Airport, New Jersey, unknown

Aircraft

 Lockheed P-38 Lightning (1942–1945)
 North American F-51 Mustang (1947–1949)
 Lockheed F-94B Starfire (1952–1953)
 North American F-86D Sabre (1953–1957)
 North American F-86L Sabre (1957–1958)

 Convair F-102 Delta Dagger (1958–1959)
 Convair F-106 Delta Dart (1959–1972)
 Lockheed T-33 T-Bird (1974–1988)
 McDonnell Douglas F-15 Eagle (1988–2010)
 Lockheed Martin F-22 Raptor (2013–2019)

Awards and Campaigns

See also

 Aerospace Defense Command Fighter Squadrons

References

Notes

Citations

Bibliography

 
 Buss, Lydus H.(ed), Sturm, Thomas A., Volan, Denys, and McMullen, Richard F., History of Continental Air Defense Command and Air Defense Command July to December 1955, Directorate of Historical Services, Air Defense Command, Ent AFB, CO, 1956
 
 
 
 McMullen, Richard F. (1964) "The Fighter Interceptor Force 1962-1964"  ADC Historical Study No. 27, Air Defense Command, Ent Air Force Base, CO (Confidential, declassified 22 March 2000)
 Newton, Wesley P., Jr. and Senning, Calvin F., (1963)  USAF Credits for the Destruction of  Enemy Aircraft, World War II, USAF Historical Study No. 85
 
 82d Training Wing History Office, A Brief History of the 82d Flying Training Wing and Sheppard AFB (January 2012) retrieved 15 November 2013
 NORAD/CONAD Participation in the Cuban Missile Crisis, Historical Reference Paper No. 8, Directorate of Command History Continental Air Defense Command, Ent AFB, CO, 1 Feb 63 (Top Secret NOFORN declassified 9 March 1996). P. 16

Further reading
 
 
 
 Coles, Harry C., (1945)  Participation by the Ninth and Twelfth Air Forces in the Sicilian Campaign, USAF Historical Study No. 37
 Grant, C.L., (1961)  The Development of Continental Air Defense to 1 September 1954, USAF Historical Study No. 126
 
 
 USAF Aerospace Defense Command publication, The Interceptor, January 1979 (Volume 21, Number 1).

External links
95th Fighter Squadron Fact Sheet

095
Military units and formations established in 1941
Military units and formations in Florida
095